Phanerophthalmus is a genus of medium-sized sea snails or bubble snails, marine opisthobranch gastropod molluscs in the family Haminoeidae, the haminoea bubble snails, part of the clade Cephalaspidea, the headshield slugs and bubble snails.

Species
 Phanerophthalmus albocollaris Heller & T. E. Thompson, 1983
 Phanerophthalmus albotriangulatus Austin, Gosliner & Malaquias, 2018
 Phanerophthalmus anettae Austin, Gosliner & Malaquias, 2018
 Phanerophthalmus batangas Austin, Gosliner & Malaquias, 2018
 Phanerophthalmus boucheti Austin, Gosliner & Malaquias, 2018
 Phanerophthalmus cerverai Austin, Gosliner & Malaquias, 2018
 Phanerophthalmus cylindricus (Pease, 1861)
 Phanerophthalmus engeli (Labbé, 1934)
 Phanerophthalmus lentigines Austin, Gosliner & Malaquias, 2018
 Phanerophthalmus luteus (Quoy & Gaimard, 1833)
 Phanerophthalmus minikoiensis (E. A. Smith, 1903)
 Phanerophthalmus olivaceus (Ehrenberg, 1828)
 Phanerophthalmus paulayi Austin, Gosliner & Malaquias, 2018
 Phanerophthalmus perpallidus Risbec, 1928
 Phanerophthalmus purpura Austin, Gosliner & Malaquias, 2018
 Phanerophthalmus rudmani Austin, Gosliner & Malaquias, 2018
 Phanerophthalmus tibiricae Austin, Gosliner & Malaquias, 2018
Synonyms
 Phanerophthalmus albotriangulatum Austin, Gosliner & Malaquias, 2018: synonym of Phanerophthalmus albotriangulatus Austin, Gosliner & Malaquias, 2018 (wrong gender agreement of specific epithet)
 Phanerophthalmus collaris Eales, 1938: synonym of Phanerophthalmus minikoiensis (E. A. Smith, 1903) (uncertain synonym)
 Phanerophthalmus pauper Bergh, 1905: synonym of Phanerophthalmus luteus (Quoy & Gaimard, 1833)
 Phanerophthalmus smaragdinus (Rüppell & Leuckart, 1830): synonym of Phanerophthalmus olivaceus (Ehrenberg, 1828)

References

 Rudman, W. B. (1972). The herbivorous opisthobranch genera Phanerophthalmus A. Adams and Smaragdinella A. Adams. Proceedings of the Malacological Society of London. 40: 189-210

External links

 Adams, A. (1850). Monograph of the family Bullidae. In: G.B. Sowerby II (ed.), Thesaurus Conchyliorum, vol. 2: 553-608, pls 119-125. London, privately published
 Ehrenberg C.G. (1828-1831). Animalia evertebrata exclusis Insectis. Series prima. In: F.G. Hemprich & C.G. Ehrenberg, Symbolae physicae, seu icones et descriptiones Mammalium, Avium, Insectorum et animalia evertebra, quae ex itinere per Africam borealem et Asiam occidentalem studio nova aut illustrata redierunt. 126 pp. (1831), 10 pls (1828)
  Pruvot-Fol, A. (1931-1932). Notes de systématique sur les opisthobranches. Bulletin du Muséum National d'Histoire Naturelle. ser. 2, 3(3): 308-316
 Gray, J. E. (1850). (text). In: Gray, M. E., Figures of molluscous animals, selected from various authors. Longman, Brown, Green and Longmans, London. Vol. 4, iv + 219 pp. (August) 
 Austin J., Gosliner T. & Malaquias M.A.E. (2018). Systematic revision, diversity patterns and trophic ecology of the tropical Indo-West Pacific sea slug genus Phanerophthalmus A. Adams, 1850 (Cephalaspidea, Haminoeidae). Invertebrate Systematics. 32(6): 1336-1387
 Yonow N. & Jensen K.R. (2018). Results of the Rumphius Biohistorical Expedition to Ambon (1990). Part 17. The Cephalaspidea, Anaspidea, Pleurobranchia, and Sacoglossa (Mollusca: Gastropoda: Heterobranchia). Archiv für Molluskenkunde. 147(1): 1-48
 Oskars T.R., Too C.C., Rees D., Mikkelsen P.M., Willassen E. & Malaquias M.A.E. (2019). A molecular phylogeny of the gastropod family Haminoeidae sensu lato (Heterobranchia: Cephalaspidea): a generic revision. Invertebrate Systematics. 33: 426-472

 
Haminoeidae
Gastropod genera